South Core is a neighbourhood located in downtown Toronto, Ontario, Canada. The South Core occupies the eastern portions of the Railway Lands. The remodeling and restoration of Union Station and the construction of a new wave of business and condominium towers is central to this area's forecast growth.

"Forecasters expect the downtown population to grow 80 per cent to 130,000 by 2031. With the financial district just to the north and the new high-rise South Core on the other side, Union is right at the centre."

The area has grown rapidly in the last several years.  Toronto's Gardiner Expressway is currently being rebuilt to provide a new one-acre park in the area.  Two ramps to the expressway at York and Bay streets are being removed to make room for the park.

History

The South Core was once part Toronto Harbour and now lies on land fill done from the 1850s to 1920s to accommodate railway lines. From the mid-1950s to the mid-1960s, the Gardiner Expressway was erected, cutting off much of the city from the Toronto waterfront as rings of highways were built around many North American cities as was the trend at the time.

In previous decades, much of the land was unusable due to its designation as rail lands.  Today, that stigma is gone as multiple business and condominium towers have risen and more continue to be built.  The name South Core derives from south of the downtown (or financial) core of the city.

Location

The district is bounded on its western side by Lower Simcoe Street, its eastern side by Lower Jarvis Street, its northern side by the railway tracks and southern side by Lake Ontario. Union Station lies within the district as well.

The area is a re-imagining of portions of the Railway Lands and is connected to the city through the extensive PATH network of underground walkways connecting Union Station, Scotiabank Arena and other notable landmarks.

"But in the past few years, something remarkable and unexpected has happened. The barrier effect, once considered permanent, has faded away. Development has jumped over the railway tracks to create a teeming new district becoming known as the South Core. Office and condominium towers are nudging right up to the Gardiner, clustering both north and south of Fred Gardiner’s elevated behemoth."

Amenities and notable buildings

In October 2013, Delta Hotels announced a new flagship hotel central to South Core.

Maple Leaf Square, a multi-use complex and public square next to Scotiabank Arena, sometimes plays host to live broadcasts of sporting events on the video screen facing Bremner Boulevard. Real Sports Bar & Grill, one of North America's largest sports bars, is located inside Maple Leaf Square.

The Telus Tower, PwC Tower and CIBC Square are prominent office towers in the district.

Harbour Plaza is a new condominium project being built at York Street and was supposed to have Target Canada as the major tenant, but Target has pulled out of the Canadian market, leaving the space without a tenant.

Sugar Wharf is a mixed use development under construction.

Other notable buildings in the area include:
 Loblaws supermarket and LCBO headquarters are located on the east end of SoCo.
 Queen's Quay Terminal
 The Power Plant Contemporary Art Gallery
 Jack Layton Ferry Terminal
 Redpath Sugar Refinery and Sugar Museum
 Toronto Star Building
 Harbour Castle Westin Hotel
 Toronto Harbour Commission Building (THC)
 Toronto Transportation Commission's Harbour Yard located on the south side of Lake Shore Boulevard from Bay to York Streets was used to store streetcars from 1951 to 1954. It is now the site of Waterpark Place office towers and parking lot.
 Ten York

Travel and transit

The PATH network connects to the Toronto Waterfront Trail through 85 Harbour Street (also known as Waterpark Place III)

Union Station is one of the busiest commuter hubs in Canada and sees tens of thousands of commuters pass through every day.

The Metrolinx Union Pearson Express provides transportation between Toronto Pearson airport and Union Station by rail.

Union Station Bus Terminal is also located within the South Core and provides transit connections from the area to the rest of the Greater Toronto Area.

See also

 Financial District, Toronto
 Southcore Financial Centre
 Waterfront Trail

References

PATH (Toronto)
µ
Harbourfront, Toronto